Zoe Ventoura is an Australian actress. She played Melissa Rafter in Packed to the Rafters from 2008 to 2010. The character's death earned Ventoura a nomination for the Logie Award for Most Popular Actress in 2011. That same year, Ventoura starred alongside actor Daniel MacPherson, whom she later married, in Wild Boys. Other roles include Miki Mavros in the television comedy series Kick and Sonya Hyde in Hyde and Seek. Ventoura joined the recurring cast of Home and Away as Alex Neilson in 2019.

Early and personal life
Ventoura attended Penrhos College in Perth, Western Australia.

In December 2014, Ventoura became engaged to longtime partner and Wild Boys co-star Daniel MacPherson, and they married in Noosa in November 2015. The couple have one child, a son born in December 2019. A year later, Ventoura announced that the pair had separated.

Career
Ventoura portrayed Melissa Rafter (née Bannon) in Packed to the Rafters.  Her shock on-screen death was the highest rating episode of the hugely popular series, and gained her a nomination for the Logie Award for Most Popular Actress in 2011. That same year, Ventoura starred alongside actor Daniel MacPherson in the Seven Network colonial drama Wild Boys.

Ventoura is also known for starring as Miki Mavros in the SBS television comedy series Kick, for which she earned two Logie nominations. She has also had a number of roles in the theatre, film and other television series such as Last Man Standing, US feature films Drive Hard, Fatal Honeymoon and the horror movie See No Evil.  She appeared in Disney's Pirates of the Caribbean: Dead Men Tell No Tales, and The Osiris Child: Science Fiction Volume One by director Shane Abbess. In 2016, Ventoura starred opposite Matt Nable as Sonya Hyde in the Australian thriller, Hyde and Seek for Channel 9.

Ventoura joined the cast of television soap opera Home and Away as Alex Neilson in April 2019 during the show's thirty-second season. She made her first on-screen appearance on 22 August 2019.

In September 2020, it was announced that Ventoura had joined the cast of Nine Network drama series Doctor Doctor for its fifth season, which aired in 2021.

Filmography

Television

Film

References

External links

1981 births
Living people
Australian film actresses
Australian television actresses
Actresses from Perth, Western Australia
Australian people of Greek descent
20th-century Australian actresses
21st-century Australian actresses